The Bayer designation s Eridani and the variable star designation S Eridani are distinct. Due to technical limitations, both designations link here. For the star
s Eridani, see HD 16754
S Eridani, see 64 Eridani

HD 16754, s
Eridanus (constellation)